Kekkonen is a Finnish surname. Notable people with the surname include:

 Juho Kekkonen (1890–1951), Finnish schoolteacher and politician
 Urho Kekkonen (1900–1986), the President of Finland from 1956 to 1982.
 Sylvi Kekkonen (1900-1974), writer and wife of Urho Kekkonen
 Jussi Kekkonen (1910–1962), Finnish major, younger brother of Urho Kekkonen
 Helena Kekkonen (1926–2014), Finnish peace activist
 Matti Kekkonen (1928–2013), Finnish politician, son of Urho Kekkonen
 Taneli Kekkonen (1928–1985), Finnish diplomat, son of Urho Kekkonen
 Maria Kekkonen (born 1976), Finnish erotic actress and reporter

Finnish-language surnames